Rudykillus is the debut album of Nigerian singer Rudeboy as a solo artist. It was released on 5 August 2021.

Background
The 12-track album has a running time of 57 minutes. "Woman", "Audio Money", and "Reason with Me" were later added as bonus tracks.

The producers includes Chrisstringz (tracks 1, 2, 3, 5, 6, 7, 8, 10 and 11), Sele B (track 4), Orbeat (track 9) and LordSky (track 12).

Singles

"Focus" was released as a single from the album on 23 July 2021.

Reception

Motolani Alake of Pulse Nigeria rated the album 5.0/10 adding that "across 15 tracks, the album sounds way too familiar. It feels like we've heard it all before."

Olalekan Okeremilekun of TooXclusive rated the album 7/10 adding that "many of the songs on this album would have brought out a different taste in sound if there were features on them"

Track listing

References

Albums by Nigerian artists
Afro pop music albums
2021 debut albums